Illinois's 8th House of Representatives district is a Representative district within the Illinois House of Representatives located in Cook County, Illinois. It has been represented by Democrat La Shawn Ford since January 10, 2007. The district was previously represented by Democrat Calvin Giles from 1993 to 2007.

Located in the Chicago metropolitan area, the district includes parts of Berwyn, Broadview, Chicago, Cicero, Countryside, Forest Park, Hodgkins, La Grange, La Grange Park, North Riverside, Oak Park, Westchester, Western Springs and parts of the Chicago neighborhood of Austin.

Representative district history

Prominent representatives

List of representatives

1849 – 1854

1854 – 1871

1871 – 1873

1957 – 1973

1983 – Present

Historic District Boundaries

Electoral history

2030 – 2022

2020 – 2012

2010 – 2002

2000 – 1992

1990 – 1982

1970 – 1962

1960 – 1956

Notes

References

Illinois House of Representatives districts
Government of Chicago